Robat (also Romanized as Robāţ; also known as Ribāt) is a village in Khararud Rural District, in the Central District of Khodabandeh County, Zanjan Province, Iran. At the 2006 census, its population was 65, in 16 families.

References 

Populated places in Khodabandeh County